Becoming I (stylized in all lowercase) is the second and final studio album by the American nu metal band Ünloco. The album was released on March 11, 2003 via Maverick. Produced by Andrew Murdock, the band's sound took an unexpected, somber turn toward a more melodic, metal-acoustic style. The second offering included two acoustic tracks — "Watching Me Slip" and "Texas". Sonically, the new style combined screams with resolute, poetic candour, surprising old and new fans alike.

Despite positive reviews from critics and the promotional support of their label — with appearances at Ozzfest 2003, Music as a Weapon II, and a tour with Korn — the album failed to meet commercial expectations and the band disbanded later the same year (and would not reform until 2014).

"Failure" served as the album's single and had a music video which gained minimal airplay. The song "Bruises" is featured in the True Crime: Streets of L.A. soundtrack as well as The Matrix Reloaded soundtrack. The song "Crashing" was featured on Madden NFL 2004. A live version of the song, as well as "Empty", was included on the Music as a Weapon II CD in February 2004.

Track listing

References

External links
 "Failure" music video at MTV.com

2003 albums
Ünloco albums
Maverick Records albums